Al-Watiq II, (died 13 November 1386) was the ninth Abbasid caliph of Cairo for the Mamluk Sultanate between 1383 and 1386.

Bibliography

Cairo-era Abbasid caliphs
14th-century births
1386 deaths
14th-century Abbasid caliphs
Sons of Abbasid caliphs